Lan Nai Wan, or Man Yee Wan, was a bay in Sai Kung Peninsula, Sai Kung, New Territories, Hong Kong. It is now part of the High Island Reservoir. There was once a village called Lan Nai Wan Village or Man Yee Wan Village on the bay.

In the 1970s, the Hong Kong government decided to construct a reservoir (High Island Reservoir) in the bay and ten of the surrounding villages, including Lan Nai Wan, Pak Tam Chung and Sha Tsui, were submerged by rising water or fell within the catchment area of the reservoir after construction. The villagers were then relocated to areas near Sai Kung Old Town and Sai Kung Public Pier.

See also
High Island Reservoir
Man Yee Wan New Village

References

External links
 
 Photograph: Ancestor Hall of Zou Family, Lan Nai Wan Village, Sai Kung

Populated places in Hong Kong
Bays of Hong Kong
Sai Kung Peninsula
Sai Kung District